Allan Gordon Parr (August 16, 1879 – July 7, 1954) was a Canadian professional ice hockey goaltender. He played for the Vancouver Millionaires of the Pacific Coast Hockey Association from 1911 to 1914. He later worked as an electrician. He died of heart disease in Vancouver in 1954.

References
granddaughter Susan Elizabeth Parr
Born in Vancouver April 23 1962 and grew up in his family home
Grandson David Allan Parr
Born in Vancouver December 17 1964 grew up in big family home

External links
Allan Parr at JustSportsStats

1879 births
1954 deaths
Canadian ice hockey goaltenders
Ice hockey people from Ottawa
Vancouver Millionaires players